Jack Sargeant (born 1994) is a Welsh Labour Party politician, and a Member of the Senedd (MS). He represents the Alyn and Deeside constituency, where he succeeded his father Carl Sargeant following the February 2018 by-election.

Background
Sargeant was born in Rhuddlan in Flint in 1994 and attended Connah's Quay High School. He studied for an engineering apprenticeship at Deeside College before completing a degree course at Glyndŵr University in Wrexham, then working in DRB.

He was elected as MS for Alyn and Deeside at a by-election held on 6 February 2018. He succeeded his father, the previous incumbent Carl Sargeant, after Carl died by suicide in November 2017. At 23 years of age, Jack Sargeant became the youngest ever AM (now MS) when he was elected to the National Assembly (now the Senedd).

Campaigns 
Sargeant is an active campaigner in support of World Suicide Prevention Day, an occasion which is held on 10 September each year. He has launched an initiative called The 84, named after the 84 men who take their own lives each week in the UK.

The initiative is backed by major sports clubs in Wales, including Cardiff City F.C., Swansea City A.F.C., Newport County A.F.C., Wrexham A.F.C. and Connah's Quay Nomads F.C., who all agreed to share suicide prevention messages with the hashtag #ItsOkNotToBeOk to support the campaign. The clubs have also worked to include suicide prevention messages into fixtures, such as including Samaritans in their match day events on the weekend of 14 and 15 September, and holding bucket collections.

Sargeant himself has spoken about the impact of suicide, stating he "sometimes finds it difficult to get up in the morning after losing his father Carl."

He is also a supporter of Parkinson's UK.

References

1994 births
Living people
People from Rhuddlan
Welsh Labour members of the Senedd
Wales MSs 2016–2021
Wales MSs 2021–2026